José Miguel Insulza Salinas (born June 2, 1943) is a Chilean politician, lawyer, and academic serving as a senator for the Arica y Parinacota Region since 2018. He previously served as Minister of Foreign Affairs from 1994 to 1999 and Minister Secretary-General of the Presidency from 1999 to 2000 under president Eduardo Frei Ruiz-Tagle, as Minister of the Interior from 2000 to 2005 under president Ricardo Lagos, and as Secretary General of the Organization of American States from 2005 to 2015.
 	
Insulza is nicknamed El Panzer in Chile, for his tank-like drive and reputation due to his ability to take political heat with little apparent damage. He is married to Georgina Núñez Reyes (Mexican) and has three children.

He is married to Georgina Núñez Reyes and has three children.

Early life and education
Insulza completed his primary and secondary education at St. George's College, an elite American English-language school in Santiago, Chile. He demonstrated an early interest in civil service while studying law at the University of Chile, serving as president of the Law Students Center, vice president of the University of Chile Student Federation (FECH), and President of the National Association of Student Unions (UFUCH). After graduating from law school, he obtained a graduate degree from the Latin American Social Sciences Faculty (FLACSO) and a Master of Arts in political science from the University of Michigan. He was professor of Political Theory at the University of Chile and of Political Science at the Catholic University in Chile until 1973.

Career

Early beginnings
Insulza was a member of the Popular Unitary Action Movement (MAPU) from 1969 to 1973. He ran for deputy for the Third District of Santiago, Puente Alto, in the 1973 parliamentary election but was unsuccessful. He served as Political Advisor to the Chilean Ministry of Foreign Affairs and Director of the Diplomatic Academy of Chile in 1973.

Exile in Mexico
Following the 1973 Chilean coup d'état, Insulza was prohibited from re-entering Chile (he had been at an international conference in Paris at the time). He spent the next 15 years in exile, living first in Rome, Italy from 1974 to 1981 and then in Mexico from 1981 to 1988. There, he worked as a researcher, eventually becoming the Director of the United States Studies Institute at the Centro de Investigación y Docencia Económicas (CIDE). He also taught at the National Autonomous University of Mexico, the Universidad Iberoamericana, and the Diplomatic Studies Institute. He has written numerous publications in his field.

He joined the Socialist Party of Chile in 1985.

Return to Chile
Insulza returned to Chile in early 1988 and joined the Concertación coalition of left-leaning political parties as a member of the Socialist Party. Following the end of military rule, Insulza was appointed Chilean Ambassador for International Cooperation in 1990. He became Director of Multilateral Economic Affairs at the Ministry of Foreign Affairs and Vice President of the International Cooperation Agency (AGCI) some time later. He became a member of the Chilean Association of Political Science, the Bar Association, and the Chilean Council of International Relations.

On March 11, 1994, Insulza became Undersecretary of Foreign Affairs under president Eduardo Frei Ruiz-Tagle. On September 20, 1994, he rose to the position of Minister of Foreign Affairs. On June 22, 1999, he became Minister Secretary-General of the Presidency. On March 11, 2000, he took office as Minister of the Interior under president Ricardo Lagos.

Secretary General of the Organization of American States
Insulza was elected Secretary General of the Organization of American States on May 2, 2005, following Mexican Foreign Secretary Luis Ernesto Derbez's withdrawal from the race. (See 2005 Organization of American States Secretary General election.)

On January 5, 2007, Insulza criticized Venezuelan president Hugo Chávez's decision not to renew television channel RCTV's broadcast license (Chávez had accused the station of being a coup d'état instigator.) Three days later, Chávez responded to Insulza by calling for his resignation and referring to him as a pendejo—a Spanish profanity equivalent to "dumbass". Insulza later received the support of several OAS members, including the US, and Chávez conceded he had gone too far with his words. In April 2008, Chávez congratulated Insulza for stating in a presentation before the United States House of Representatives Subcommittee on the Western Hemisphere that there was no evidence linking Venezuela to terrorist groups.

Insulza openly stated his intention to run for President of Chile, but withdrew from the race on January 5, 2009 and vowed to continue as Secretary General of the OAS until the end of his mandate. He gave his support to Eduardo Frei Ruiz-Tagle as the Concertación candidate for president.

On March 24, 2010, Insulza—the sole candidate—was reelected (with the abstention of Bolivia) as OAS chief for another five-year term.

Insulza won the Washington Office on Latin America's prestigious Human Rights Award in 2008. In 2014 Insulza was awarded the prestigious Kalman H. Silvert Award presented by the Council on Hemispheric Affairs.

Criticism
As Secretary General, Insulza was criticized for not taking enough action against human rights abuses in the Americas. In 2008, the Human Rights Foundation started the "Inter-American Democratic Charter and Mr. Insulza" program, to inform Insulza every month of human rights abuses taking place in the Americas.

Later career
In 2019, Insulza joined the inaugural meeting of the so-called Puebla Group in Buenos Aires, a conference of left-leaning political leaders.

References

Links
Biography at OAS site
Insulza CV (OAS.org)
 "Perfil de Insulza, futuro Secretario General de la OEA" (El Mercurio Online, Santiago)
 (grassrootsonline.org)

External links

 "Checkmate by Default: Insulza Wins OAS Race because he is the Sole Candidate that Remains" (The Council on Hemispheric Affairs, May 2, 2005)
 Biography by CIDOB (in Spanish)

1943 births
Living people
Chilean diplomats
Chilean exiles
Chilean agnostics
Chilean Ministers of the Interior
Foreign ministers of Chile
Chilean Ministers Secretary General of the Presidency
Saint George's College, Santiago alumni
Academic staff of Universidad Iberoamericana
Academic staff of the National Autonomous University of Mexico
People from Santiago
University of Chile alumni
University of Michigan alumni
Popular Unitary Action Movement politicians
Socialist Party of Chile politicians
Candidates for President of Chile
Secretaries General of the Organization of American States
Recipients of the Medal of the Oriental Republic of Uruguay
Senators of the LV Legislative Period of the National Congress of Chile
Senators of the LVI Legislative Period of the National Congress of Chile